This is the list of awards and nominations received by South Korean boy band Highlight, formerly known as Beast.

Their major accolades includes Artist of the Year awards at the 2011 and 2012 Melon Music Awards, Song of the Year award at the 2011 KBS Music Festival for "Fiction" from their 2011 album Fiction and Fact, as well as Record of the Year at the 2015 Seoul Music Awards for their 2014 album Time.

Awards and nominations

Other accolades

State honors

Listicles

Notes

References 

Highlight
Awards